The Linear Park Arts Discovery Trail is a trail covering several adjacent parks in Warragul, Victoria. It features painted bollards, mosaics and murals.

Connections
The Drouin to Warragul Two Towns Trail finishes at the Linear Park Arts Discovery Trail.

References

External links
 View at OpenStreetMap

Transport in Victoria (Australia)